Ari Folman (born December 17, 1962) is an Israeli film director, screenwriter, animator, and film-score composer. He directed the Oscar-nominated animated documentary film Waltz with Bashir (2008) and the live-action/animated film The Congress.

Biography
Ari Folman was born in Haifa. His parents were Holocaust survivors. Folman's wife, Anat Asulin, is also a film director. They live in Tel Aviv.

Film career
In 2006, Folman was head writer of the Hot 3 famous drama series BeTipul. 
Ari Folman's memories of the aftermath of the 1982 Sabra and Shatila massacre, which took place when he was a 19-year-old soldier, served as the basis for his movie Waltz with Bashir. The film follows his attempt to regain his memories of the war through therapy, as well as conversations with old friends and other Israelis who were present in Beirut around the time of the massacre.

Where is Anne Frank is an animated drama film based on the life of Anne Frank, who was murdered in the Holocaust

Awards and recognition
 Ophir Award - Best Director - Saint Clara (1996)
 Karlovy Vary International Film Festival - Special Prize of the Jury - Saint Clara (1996)
 Award of the Israeli Television Academy - Best Script for a Drama Series (along with 5 other writers) - Betipul (2006)
 Recipient of the Lynn and Jules Kroll Fund for Jewish Documentary Film - Waltz with Bashir (2007)
 Ophir Award - Best Director - Waltz with Bashir (2008)
 Ophir Award - Best Screenplay - Waltz with Bashir (2008)
 Golden Globe Award for Best Foreign Language Film - Waltz with Bashir (2008)
 Directors Guild of America Awards - Outstanding Directorial Achievement in Documentary - Waltz with Bashir (2008)
 Writers Guild of America Awards - Best Documentary Screenplay - Waltz with Bashir (2008)
 Animafest Zagreb - Grand Prix for feature film - Waltz with Bashir (2009)
 Tokyo Anime Award Festival - Animation of the Year Featured Film Category - The Congress (2014)

Filmography
 Sha'anan Si (1991, short documentary, with Ori Sivan)
 Saint Clara (1996, with Ori Sivan)
 Made in Israel (2001)
 Waltz with Bashir (2008)
 The Congress (2013)
 Where Is Anne Frank (2021)

References

External links
 

1962 births
Israeli film directors
Israeli male screenwriters
Israeli film score composers
Living people
People from Haifa
Tel Aviv University alumni
Hebrew Reali School alumni
Israeli animators
Jewish artists
Television composers
Writers Guild of America Award winners
European Film Awards winners (people)
Directors Guild of America Award winners
Male television composers
Male film score composers
Postmodernist filmmakers